Richard Dutoit Carlson (April 29, 1912 – November 25, 1977) was an American actor, television and film director, and screenwriter.

Early life
Carlson was the son of a Danish-born lawyer in Albert Lea, Minnesota. He majored in drama at the University of Minnesota, where he wrote and directed plays and was a member of Phi Beta Kappa. He graduated cum laude with a Master of Arts degree. Carlson then opened his own repertory theater in Saint Paul, Minnesota. When the theater failed, Carlson moved to New York City.

Career

Broadway
In 1935, Carlson made his acting debut on Broadway in Three Men on a Horse, and appeared with Ethel Barrymore in Ghost of Yankee Doodle (1937-8) and Whiteoaks (1938).

In 1937, he wrote and staged the play Western Waters, which ran for only seven performances. He also appeared in Now You've Done It (1937).

Early films
Carlson then moved to California, where he joined the Pasadena Playhouse. His first film role was in The Young in Heart (1938). He had a supporting role in The Duke of West Point (1938) then was second billed to Ann Sheridan in Winter Carnival (1939). He returned to Broadway for Stars in Your Eyes (1939). Metro-Goldwyn-Mayer cast him in two films with Lana Turner (These Glamour Girls  and Dancing Co-Ed, both released in 1939).

Carlson was the male lead in such films as Little Accident (1939), Beyond Tomorrow (1940), The Ghost Breakers (1940), The Howards of Virginia (1940), Too Many Girls (1940), No, No, Nanette (1941), Back Street (1941), West Point Widow (1941), The Little Foxes (1941), Secrets of G32 (1942), The Affairs of Martha (1942), Highways by Night (1942), and My Heart Belongs to Daddy (1942).

Metro-Goldwyn-Mayer
Carlson appeared in several films for MGM in the early 1940s, including White Cargo (1942), Presenting Lily Mars (1943), A Stranger in Town (1943), Young Ideas (1943), and The Man from Down Under (1943).

During World War II, Carlson served in the United States Navy.

Post-war
When he returned to Hollywood, he had few offers of employment, and turned to writing to supplement his income.

He landed supporting roles in So Well Remembered (1947) and The Amazing Mr. X (1948) and the lead in Behind Locked Doors (1948). In 1950, he co-starred with Deborah Kerr and Stewart Granger in the highly successful adventure film King Solomon's Mines, filmed on location in the Kenya Colony and the Belgian Congo. While shooting in Africa, Carlson wrote a series of articles for The Saturday Evening Post, collectively titled "Diary of a Hollywood Safari."

Despite the film's success, Carlson remained a supporting actor: The Sound of Fury (1950), Valentino (1951), A Millionaire for Christy (1951), and The Blue Veil (1951). He did play the lead in the low-budget Whispering Smith Hits London (1952), and Retreat, Hell! (1952).

On July 14, 1951, Carlson and then U.S. Senator Hubert Humphrey were the guests on the CBS live variety show Faye Emerson's Wonderful Town, in which hostess Faye Emerson visited Minneapolis to accent the kinds of music popular in the city.

Carlson began to appear regularly on television shows such as The Ford Theatre Hour, Cameo Theatre, Lights Out, Celanese Theatre, Robert Montgomery Presents, Hollywood Opening Night, and The Ford Television Theatre.

Carlson appeared in the films The Rose Bowl Story (1952), Eagles of the Fleet (1952), and Seminole (1953).

Carlson wrote episodes of Schlitz Playhouse and Kraft Theatre.

Science fiction
Carlson played the lead in The Magnetic Monster (1953) which led to him finding a niche in the newly re-emergent genres of science fiction and horror.

He followed it with leads in The Maze (1953), It Came from Outer Space (1953) with Barbara Rush, and Creature from the Black Lagoon (1954) with Julie Adams. He also had the male lead in All I Desire (1953). He also starred in the 1954 movie  Riders to the Stars.

From 1953 to 1956, he starred in the TV series I Led 3 Lives.

Director
Carlson's success in the genre led him to the director's chair for the 1954 science fiction film Riders to the Stars, in which he also starred.

He then directed Four Guns to the Border (1954).

Carlson kept busy on television in shows like General Electric Theatre, Matinee Theatre, Kraft Theatre, Lux Video Theatre, Climax!, Studio One in Hollywood, Schlitz Playhouse, and The Best of Broadway. He also appeared in films like The Last Command (1955), Bengazi (1955) and The Helen Morgan Story (1957).

His third feature as director was Appointment with a Shadow (1957).

In 1957 and 1958, Carlson played "Mr. Fiction Writer" in three of the nine films made for television collectively titled The Bell Laboratory Science Series. He also directed his final film for the project, The Unchained Goddess.

In 1957 he was cast as two different clergymen, Rabbi Avraham Soltes and Father William Wendt, in the episodes "The Happy Gift" and "Call for Help", respectively, of the syndicated religious anthology series, Crossroads.

Carlson's fourth film as director was The Saga of Hemp Brown (1958) and he wrote Johnny Rocco (1958).

Mackenzie's Raiders
In 1959, Carlson was cast as Paul Drake in "The Faithless" of the NBC western series Riverboat, with Darren McGavin. In the story line, Drake is an escaped prisoner with medical training being transported on the river vessel, the Enterprise, back to jail. Having lost his religious faith, Drake refuses to render medical assistance to a two-year-old girl stricken with a communicable disease which threatens the entire vessel. William Phipps and Jeanne Bates play the parents of the child. Bethel Leslie portrays Cathy Norris.

Carlson began directing for television: The Man and the Challenge (which he also wrote for), This Man Dawson, Men Into Space, Alcoa Premiere, and The Detectives.

His early 1960s credits as actor included The Chevy Mystery Show, Tormented, The Aquanauts (which he also directed), The Loretta Young Show (which he also directed), Bus Stop, Thriller (which he also directed), Going My Way, Arrest and Trial, The Fugitive, Wagon Train, The Christophers, and Burke's Law. He wrote episodes of Daktari and the movie Island of the Lost (1967).

In 1965, he played a mad scientist who creates a mutant, killer octopus in the Voyage to the Bottom of the Sea episode "The Village of Guilt".

He was in the films Della (1965) and Kid Rodelo (1965), directing the latter. He acted in the series The Virginian, Bonanza and Rawhide.

In the final two seasons of CBS's Perry Mason, Carlson made two guest appearances, both times as the murder victim. In 1964 he played Anthony Fry in "The Case of the Tragic Trophy;" in 1966, he played Clete Hawley in "The Case of the Avenging Angel."

Later work
Carlson was in the movies The Doomsday Flight (1966), The Power (1968), and The Valley of Gwangi (1968). Carlson's last movie role was in the 1969 Elvis Presley/Mary Tyler Moore film, Change of Habit.

Carlson appeared in episodes of The FBI, Lancer, Cannon, Owen Marshall, Counselor at Law, and Mobile One. His final role was in a 1975 episode of the television series Khan!. Carlson wrote for O'Hara, U.S. Treasury, Owen Marshall, Counselor at Law and Mannix.

Personal life
Carlson married Mona Carlson in 1939.

He died of a cerebral hemorrhage at the age of 65 on November 25, 1977, in Encino, California.  He was buried in Los Angeles National Cemetery in West Los Angeles.

Legacy
Carlson is often mistaken for actor Hugh Marlowe. In spite of a notable resemblance, the two actors were not related.

For his contribution to the television industry, Carlson has a star on the Hollywood Walk of Fame at 6333 Hollywood Blvd.

Filmography

References

External links

1912 births
1977 deaths
University of Minnesota College of Liberal Arts alumni
Male actors from Minnesota
American male film actors
United States Navy personnel of World War II
American male screenwriters
American male stage actors
American male television actors
American people of Danish descent
American television directors
People from Albert Lea, Minnesota
20th-century American male actors
Burials at Los Angeles National Cemetery
Metro-Goldwyn-Mayer contract players
Film directors from Minnesota
Screenwriters from Minnesota
United States Navy sailors
20th-century American male writers
20th-century American screenwriters
Military personnel from Minnesota